John Corry (fl. 1825) was an Irish topographer and historian writer. Among his other works he wrote and published The Life of George Washington, first published in 1800.

Life
Corry, who was self-taught, was born in the north of Ireland. As an adult he went to Dublin, where he was a journalist. About 1792 he moved to London, as a professional writer. His history after 1825 is unknown.

Works
Most of Corry's works were published anonymously. Besides editing a periodical, he furnished the letterpress for the History of Liverpool (1810), published by Thomas Troughton; wrote vol. i. of the History of Bristol, 2 vols. (1816), the second volume being supplied by John Evans; and a History of Macclesfield (1817). More ambitious was the History of Lancashire, 2 vols. (1825), with a dedication to George IV. It was, however, derivative of a work of Matthew Gregson, of 1817.

His book The Detector of Quackery (1802) was a criticism of medical frauds and quackery of his day.

Publications
 Poems, [Dublin?], 17—.
 The Adventures of Felix and Rosarito, London, 1782. 
 The Life of George Washington, London, 1800. 
 The Detector of Quackery, London, 1802 (new edition under the title of Quack Doctors Dissected, London, Gloucester [printed 1810]). 
 A Satirical View of London, London, 1801, which came to a fourth edition in 1809. 
 Edwy and Bertha, London, 1802. 
 Memoirs of Alfred Berkeley, London, 1802.
 Tales for the Amusement of Young Persons, London, 1802. 
 The Life of William Cowper, London, 1803. 
 The Life of Joseph Priestley, Birmingham, 1804 (2nd edition in the same year). 
 Sebastian and Zeila, London [1805?]. 
 The Suicide; or, the Progress of Error, London [1805?].
 The Mysterious Gentleman Farmer, 3 vols., London, 1808. 
 Strictures on the Expedience of the Addingtonian Extinguisher [i.e. Lord Sidmouth's Protestant Dissenting Bill], Macclesfield, 1811. 
 The Elopement … Third edition (the History of Eliza, &c.), London [1810?]. 
 The English Metropolis; or, London in the year 1820, London, 1820.
 Memoir of John Collier ("Tim Bobbin"), prefixed to an edition of his Works, [Manchester? 1820?], and also in the edition published at Manchester in 1862.

Notes

Attribution

18th-century Irish writers
18th-century Irish male writers
19th-century Irish writers
Critics of alternative medicine
1825 births
Year of death missing